Terhi Kokkonen (born in 1974) is a Finnish musician. She is the former vocalist of Ultra Bra. She is now the vocalist for the Finnish band Scandinavian Music Group.

References

Living people
Finnish women musicians
1974 births